Barry Railway Class C were originally  steam locomotives of the Barry Railway in South Wales.  They were designed by J. H. Hosgood and built by Sharp Stewart.

Traffic duties 
The locomotive was the first purpose built passenger locomotive built for the company.  They pulled passenger trains between Barry and Cogan on the Cardiff branch.  However, on 14 August 1893, the Barry Railway began running trains from Barry to Cardiff Riverside station (GWR) having obtained running powers over the Taff Vale from Cogan Junction to Penarth Junction and over the GWR into Cardiff Riverside, a station adjacent to the GWR's main station of Cardiff General.

Derailment 
On the first day of service, Class C no. 21 was given the honour of pulling the first train of the new Barry to Cardiff service.  It unfortunately disgraced itself by derailing on the sharp curve of Cogan Junction where the Barry joined the Taff Vale Railway.  Subsequently, traffic was held up for several hours on both railways.

Altered wheel arrangement 
The Class C operated the Barry–Cardiff service, along with the Class G, until the arrival of the Class J in 1897. Its limited fuel and water capacity rendered the Class C inadequate for the longer commuter journey.

Return to duties 
They made a limited return to the Cardiff service but ended up being assigned to other duties.  For example, No. 21 was given the task of hauling the Directors' saloon, Engineer's saloon and the Manager's Truck.  In contrast, No. 22 usually worked colliers' trains on the main line and light passenger trains on the Vale of Glamorgan line.
In 1904, the Manager's Truck was converted into the Pay Clerk's Van.  Early experiments as a self-propelled petrol engine van failed miserably with numerous breakdowns causing disruption to the scheduled traffic.  As a result, No. 21 was reassigned the task of hauling the Van in its new guise.
In 1914, the Barry Railway's two steam railmotors were converted into semi-corridor coaches and became known as the "vestibule set".  They were hauled by either Nos. 21 and 22 and the train was used on the Barry to Bridgend service.

Disposals 

Unusually for the Barry, two of the Class C were disposed of during Barry days.

Withdrawal 

The two remaining locomotives passed to the Great Western Railway in 1922.  No. 21 was withdrawn in 1926 and No. 22 in 1928.  None has been preserved.

Numbering

References 

C
2-4-0T locomotives
2-4-2T locomotives
Sharp Stewart locomotives
Railway locomotives introduced in 1889
Standard gauge steam locomotives of Great Britain
Scrapped locomotives
Passenger locomotives